Armina Sadeghian (born 22 January 2002) is an Iranian sport shooter, born in Ilam. She represented Iran at the 2020 Summer Olympics in Tokyo 2021, competing in women's 10 metre air rifle.

References

External links 
 Armina Sadeghian at ISSF
 

 

2002 births
Living people
People from Ilam Province
Iranian female sport shooters
Shooters at the 2020 Summer Olympics
Olympic shooters of Iran
Shooters at the 2018 Asian Games
21st-century Iranian women